This is an incomplete list of works by the French artist Marcel Duchamp (28 July 1887 – 2 October 1968), painter, sculptor, chess player, and writer whose work is associated with Cubism, conceptual art, and Dada.

Duchamp is commonly regarded, along with Pablo Picasso and Henri Matisse, as one of the three artists who helped to define the revolutionary developments in the plastic arts in the opening decades of the 20th century, responsible for significant developments in painting and sculpture.

The Complete Works of Marcel Duchamp, a catalogue raisonné by Arturo Schwarz, last updated in 1997, lists 663 works. This number, however, includes many studies and other preparatory works, as well as works in which Duchamp was involved but not the primary creator, such as photographs taken of him. His oeuvre includes diverse types of artworks, including paintings, drawings, sculptures, found objects ("readymades"), assemblage, boxes, and installation art.

Artworks
{| class="sortable wikitable" style="margin-left:0.5em; text-align:center"
! class="unsortable" | Image
! Name 
! Year 
! Technique
! Dimensions 
! Location 
|-
| 
|The Chess Game(Joueur d'échecs)
|1910
|Oil on canvas
|114 x 146.5 cm
|Philadelphia Museum of Art
|-
|
|Portrait of Dr. DumouchelPortrait du Dr. R. Dumouchel
|1910
|Oil on canvas
|100.3 x 65.7 cm
|Philadelphia Museum of Art
|-
|
|The Bush(Le Buisson)
|1910–1911
|Oil on canvas
|127.3 x 91.9 cm
|Philadelphia Museum of Art
|-
| 
|Coffee Mill(Moulin à café)
|1911
|Oil and graphite on board
|33 x 12.7 cm
|Tate
|-
| 
|Sonata(La Sonate)
|1911
|Oil on canvas
|90 × 74 cm
|Philadelphia Museum of Art
|-
|
|Yvonne and Magdeleine Torn in Tatters(Yvonne et Magdeleine Déchiquetées)
|1911
|Oil on canvas
|60.3 x 73.3 cm
|Philadelphia Museum of Art
|-
| 
|Nude (Study), Sad Young Man on a Train(Nu -esquisse-, jeune homme triste dans un train)
|1911–1912
|Oil on canvas
|100 x 73 cm
|Peggy Guggenheim Collection
|-
| 
|Nude Descending a Staircase, No. 2(Nu descendant un escalier n° 2)
|1912
|Oil on canvas
|147 × 89.2 cm
|Philadelphia Museum of Art
|-
| 
|The King and Queen Surrounded by Swift Nudes(Le Roi et la Reine entourés de nus vites)
|1912
|Oil on canvas
|114.6 x 128.9 cm
|Philadelphia Museum of Art
|-
|
|Bicycle Wheel(Roue de bicyclette)
|1913
|Readymade sculpture
|
|Original is lost 
|-
|
|Network of Stoppages
|1914
|Oil and pencil on canvas
|149 x 198 cm
|Museum of Modern Art
|-
|
|Bottle Rack(Porte-bouteilles)
|1914
|Readymade sculpture
|
|Original is lost 
|-
|
|In Advance of the Broken Arm(En prévision du bras cassé)
|1915
|Readymade sculpture
|
|Original is lost
|-
|
|The Bride Stripped Bare by Her Bachelors, Even (The Large Glass)(La mariée mise à nu par ses célibataires, même (Le Grand Verre))
|1915–1923
|Mixed media on glass
|277.5 × 175.9 cm
|Philadelphia Museum of Art
|-
|
|Comb
|1916
|Readymade sculpture
|
|Philadelphia Museum of Art
|-
|
| Apolinère Enameled
|1916–1917
|Gouache and graphite on painted tin, mounted on cardboard
| 24.4 × 34 cm
|Philadelphia Museum of Art
|-
|
|Tulip Hysteria Co-ordinating
|1917 
|
|
|Lost or never existed 
|-
|
|Fountain(Fontaine)
|1917
|Readymade sculpture
|
|Original is lost
|-
|
|Five-Way Portrait of Marcel Duchamp
|1917
|Gelatin silver print
|
|National Portrait Gallery
|-
|
|Hat Rack(Porte-chapeaux)
|c. 1917
|Readymade sculpture
|
|Original is lost
|-
| 
|Tu m'''
|1918
|Oil on canvas
|69.8 x 303 cm
|Yale University Art Gallery
|-
|
|50 cc of Paris Air|1919
|Readymade sculpture
|
|Philadelphia Museum of Art
|-
|
|L.H.O.O.Q.|1919
|Mass-produced postcard, altered by hand
|
|Private collection
|-
| 
|To Be Looked at (from the Other Side of the Glass) with One Eye, Close to, for Almost an Hour(À regarder d'un œil, de près, pendant presque une heure)
|1920
|Mixed media on glass
|38.5 × 46.5 cm
|Museum of Modern Art
|-
|
|Beautiful Breath, Veil Water(Belle Haleine, Eau de Voilette)
|1921
|Sculpture
|16.5 x 11.2 cm
|Private collection
|-
|
|Why Not Sneeze, Rose Sélavy?|1921
|Sculpture
|
|Philadelphia Museum of Art
|-
|
|Monte Carlo Bonds|1924
|Collage / lithograph
|31.2 x 19.3 cm
|
|-
|
|Anemic Cinema|1926
|Short film
|7 min
|
|-
|
|Fluttering Hearts(Coeurs volants)
|1936
|Collage / magazine cover design
|25 x 32 cm
|
|-
|
|Boîte-en-valise|1941–1971
|Suitcase holding small artworks
|40 x 38 x 10 cm
|
|-
|
|George Washignton (Genre allegory)(George Washington (Allegorie de genre))
|1943
|Collage
|52 x 42 cm
|Centre Pompidou
|-
|
|VVV magazine, no. 2/3
|1943
|Magazine cover design
|28 x 21 cm
|
|-
|
|View magazine, series V, no. 1
|1945
|Magazine cover design
|31 x 23 cm
|
|-
|
|Man Ray "Objects of My Affection" exhibition catalog
|1945
|Catalog cover design
|29 x 23 cm
|
|-
|
|Young Cherry Trees Secured Against Hares cover
|1946
|Book cover design
|24 x 16 cm
|
|-
|
|"Dada: 1916-1923"
|1953
|Poster/catalog design
|97 x 61 cm
|
|-
|
|Étant donnés|1949–1966
|Room-sized installation
|
|Philadelphia Museum of Art
|}

References

Bibliography
 Arturo Schwarz, The Complete Works of Marcel Duchamp, Delano Greenidge Editions, 1995
 Anne D'Harnoncourt (Intro), Joseph Cornell/Marcel Duchamp... in resonance,  Menil Foundation, Houston, 1998, 
 Linda Dalrymple Henderson, Duchamp in Context: Science and Technology in the Large Glass and Related Works, Princeton University Press, Princeton, 1998
 Paola Magi, Caccia al tesoro con Marcel Duchamp, Edizioni Archivio Dedalus, Milano, 2010, 
 Paola Magi: Treasure Hunt With Marcel Duchamp, Edizioni Archivio Dedalus, Milano, 2011, 
 Marc Décimo: Marcel Duchamp mis à nu. A propos du processus créatif (Marcel Duchamp Stripped Bare. Apropos of the creative Act), Les presses du réel, Dijon (France), 2004 .
 Marc Décimo:The Marcel Duchamp Library, perhaps (La Bibliothèque de Marcel Duchamp, peut-être), Les presses du réel, Dijon (France), 2002.
 Marc Décimo, Le Duchamp facile, Les presses du réel, coll. "L'écart absolu / Poche", Dijon, 2005
 Marc Décimo (dir.), Marcel Duchamp et l'érotisme, Les presses du réel, coll. «  L'écart absolu / Chantier », Dijon, 2008
 T.J. Demos, The Exiles of Marcel Duchamp, Cambridge, MIT Press, 2007.
 Lydie Fischer Sarazin-Levassor, A Marriage in Check. The Heart of the Bride Stripped by her Bachelor, even, Les presses du réel, Dijon (France), 2007.
 J-T. Richard, M. Duchamp mis à nu par la psychanalyse, même (M. Duchamp stripped bare even by psychoanalysis), éd. L'Harmattan, Paris (France), 2010.
 Chris Allen (Trans), Dawn Ades (Intro), Three New York Dadas and The Blind Man: Marcel Duchamp, Henri-Pierre Roché, Beatrice Wood'', Atlas Press, London, 2013, 

Lists of works of art
Works by artist
Marcel Duchamp works